Chengdu Shuangliu International Airport  is a major air hub of Western China and one of the two international airports serving Chengdu, the capital of China's Sichuan province, the other one being Chengdu Tianfu International Airport (TFU).

Shuangliu Airport is one of the two core hubs for Air China, the other being Beijing Capital International Airport. The airport is also the principal hub and headquarters for Sichuan Airlines and Chengdu Airlines. China Eastern Airlines, China Southern Airlines, Shenzhen Airlines, Lucky Air, and Tibet Airlines also have bases at Shuangliu Airport.

Shuangliu Airport was the third-busiest airport in the world and the second-busiest airport in China in 2020.

Overview

History
The airport, formerly named Shuangguisi Airport, opened as an auxiliary military airfield in 1938 during the Second Sino-Japanese War/World War II. At the time, its runway was only large enough for small biplanes. It was also where the Republic of China Air Force Polikarpov I-15 fighters of the 5th Pursuit Group were based for aerial defense of the Chengdu area against Imperial Japanese bomber raids;this following the Chinese retreat from Wuhan to Chungking (now Chongqing) as the new provisional capital in aftermath of the Battle of Wuhan against the Imperial Japanese onslaught. Civilian targets were indiscriminately bombed, and ace fighter pilot of the Chinese Air Force Major Wong Sun-shui, Captain Cen Zeliu and Lieutenant Lin Heng (younger brother of renowned architect and poet Lin Huiyin) flying in their I-15 fighter planes were all killed over Shuangliu air base as a result of battling against the most advanced fighter aircraft of the time; the Mitsubishi A6M "Zero" (Reisen) fighter, in defense of Chengdu on 14 March 1941.

When the U.S. was shocked into World War II with the Pearl Harbor attack, the airport became known as "Shwangliu Airfield" as it was later used by the United States Army Air Forces Fourteenth Air Force as part of the China Defensive Campaign (1942–1945). It was used as a fighter base by the 33d Fighter Group, which flew P-47 Thunderbolt fighter-bombers from the airport in 1944 to support Chinese ground forces, and also by reconnaissance units that operated camera-equipped P-38 Lightnings that located Japanese forces and provided intelligence to the fighter-bombers. The Americans closed their facilities at Shwangliu Airfield at the end of August 1945.

On 12 December 1956, the Shuangguisi Airport was put under civil aviation, which was then formally listed as a civil aviation airport and renamed Chengdu Shuangliu Airport. In 1957, the flights of Chengdu civil aviation were shifted to Shuangliu Airport from Guanghan Airport. The flight courses from Chengdu were thus opened to various cities within China including Beijing, Taiyuan, Xi'an, Chongqing, Kunming, Guiyang, and Nanchong. The airport went through several earlier expansions in 1959, 1967, 1983 and 1991 respectively.

Current status
A large-scale expansion was conducted on flight area and navigation area from 1994 to 2001. The newly built terminal building was incorporated with a three-parallel-porch design, accommodating an hourly capacity of 3,500 passengers during rush hours, while the previous terminal building was only designated for regional flights within Sichuan and Chongqing.

The airport is now an international civil airport with flights to more than 50 international destinations and over 170 domestic airports, and is a hub for Chengdu Airlines, Air China and Sichuan Airlines. It is linked to downtown Chengdu by the Airport Expressway, the Chengdu–Mianyang–Leshan intercity railway and the newly built Chengdu Metro line 10 which has stations in both terminals. KLM launched the first intercontinental air route from Chengdu, to Amsterdam, on 28 May 2006.

The construction of its second runway started from late 2008, and service commenced in December 2009.
The new Terminal 2 has started construction in June 2009; trial operations began on 28 July 2012 with limited airlines and was officially opened on 9 August 2012 for all domestic airlines other than Sichuan Airlines. T1 is split into Domestic and International wings, and retained all international flights from airlines within and outside China. The new terminal is twice the size of the current T1, and allows the airport to handle up to 50 million passengers annually.

On 9 June 2014, United Airlines began operating a nonstop service from San Francisco to Chengdu, connecting central China to the United States non-stop for the first time. Service to the US has since expanded, as Hainan Airlines now offers nonstop service from Chengdu to Los Angeles and began nonstop service to New York–JFK in October 2017. In addition, Sichuan Airlines and Air China have many international routes in this airport.

With the opening of Chengdu Tianfu Airport on 27 June 2021, it is planned for most international and cargo routes to be moved away from Shuangliu Airport, which is to mainly operate domestic flights going forward.

Airlines and destinations

Passenger

Other facilities
China Southwest Airlines once had its headquarters on the airport property.

Statistics

Ground transportation

Airport buses

 Airport Bus No. 1, Chengdu Shuangliu International Airport - City Centre (Minshan Hotel, Section 2 of Renmin Road South, Metro station of Jinjiang Hotel); single ticket: ￥10.
 Airport Bus No. 2, Chengdu Shuangliu International Airport - Chengdu railway station (North Railway Station); single ticket: up to ￥10.
 Airport Bus No. 3, Chengdu Shuangliu International Airport - Chengdu East railway station (Chengdu Dong Railway Station); single ticket: ￥12.

Taxi
It costs about RMB 60 Yuan from Chengdu Shuangliu International Airport to the city centre of Chengdu.

High-speed train (CRH)

Passengers can take the CRH train at Shuangliu Airport railway station to Chengdu South railway station and Chengdu East railway station; single tickets are about ￥11 (US$1.5). The CRH trains at Shuangliu Airport railway station are also bound for Mianyang, Deyang, Meishan Dong (East), Leshan railway and Emeishan railway stations.

Metro

Two stations on Line 10 of the Chengdu Metro links Chengdu Shuangliu International Airport with Taipingyuan station. The stations are Terminal 1 of Shuangliu International Airport station and Terminal 2 of Shuangliu International Airport station which serves Terminals 1 and 2 respectively. It was opened on 6 September 2017.

See also
List of airports in China

References

External links

Airports in Sichuan
Airfields of the United States Army Air Forces in China
Airports established in 1938
1938 establishments in China
Transport in Chengdu
Buildings and structures in Chengdu